Jasti (Telugu: జాస్తి) is an Indian surname.

 Jasti Chelameswar (born 1953), the former Judge of Supreme Court of India
 Teja (born as Dharma Teja Jasti, in 1966), an Indian cinematographer turned director
 Ramesh Jasti, a professor of organic chemistry
 Jasti Eswara Prasad, (1934–2021), an Indian judge